Henry Edmund Anderson (23 May 1892 – 30 October 1926) was an Australian rules footballer who played with Fitzroy in the Victorian Football League (VFL).

He later enlisted for service in World War I, serving in the 23rd and 65th Battalions before being transferred to the Employment Company. Anderson was hospitalised several times and also went AWOL several times during his four years of service.

Notes

External links 
		

1892 births
1926 deaths
Australian rules footballers from Victoria (Australia)
Fitzroy Football Club players
Australian military personnel of World War I